John Stubbs was a 16th-century English pamphleteer.

John Stubbs may also refer to:

 John Stubbs (archer) (born 1965), British Paralympic archer
 John Stubbs (author) (1938–2015), Australian political journalist
 John Stubbs (cricketer) (born 1931), Australian cricketer
 John O. Stubbs, Canadian academic
 John Stubbs (historian), British historian and author, see Samuel Johnson Prize
 John Stevenson Stubbs (1894–1924), First World War flying ace
 John William Stubbs (1821–1897), Irish mathematician and clergyman
 John Stubbs (priest), dean of Grahamstown
 John Stubbs (Quaker) (1627–1675), itinerant English Quaker minister and author

See also
John Heath-Stubbs (1918–2006), English poet and translator
Jack Stubbs (1913–1997), American set decorator